The DiV is the debut studio album by American hip hop group Pac Div, that was released on November 8, 2011.

Track listing

References

2011 debut albums
Pac Div albums
Albums produced by No I.D.
Albums produced by DJ Dahi